Pseudomacrochenus affinis is a species of beetle in the family Cerambycidae. It was described by Stephan von Breuning in 1960. It is known from India.

References

Lamiini
Beetles described in 1960
Taxa named by Stephan von Breuning (entomologist)